Brian Irr (born July 17, 1988) is an American karateka. He won the gold medal in the men's kumite +84 kg event at the 2019 Pan American Games held in Lima, Peru. In the final, he defeated Daniel Gaysinsky of Canada.

Career 

In 2015, he won one of the bronze medals in men's kumite +84 kg at the Pan American Games held in Toronto, Canada.

In June 2021, he competed at the World Olympic Qualification Tournament held in Paris, France hoping to qualify for the 2020 Summer Olympics in Tokyo, Japan. He did not qualify at this tournament but he was able to qualify via continental representation soon after. He competed in the men's +75 kg event at the Olympics. In November 2021, he competed in the men's +84 kg event at the 2021 World Karate Championships held in Dubai, United Arab Emirates.

He competed in the men's kumite +84 kg event at the 2022 World Games held in Birmingham, United States.

Achievements

References

External links 
 

Living people
1988 births
People from Amherst, New York
American male karateka
Pan American Games medalists in karate
Pan American Games gold medalists for the United States
Pan American Games bronze medalists for the United States
Karateka at the 2015 Pan American Games
Karateka at the 2019 Pan American Games
Medalists at the 2015 Pan American Games
Medalists at the 2019 Pan American Games
Karateka at the 2020 Summer Olympics
Olympic karateka of the United States
Competitors at the 2022 World Games
21st-century American people